Lorenzo Binago (1554–1629) was an Italian  late Mannerist/early Baroque architect in Milan. He was by vocation, also a Barnabite monk.

One of his pupils was the future architect Francesco Maria Richini. His major work is the influential church of Sant'Alessandro in Zebedia, begun in 1601. The bell towers to this church are a late addition.

References

1554 births
1629 deaths
Architects from Milan
Italian Baroque architects
17th-century Italian architects
16th-century Italian Christian monks
16th-century Italian architects